Parr is a surname.

People with the surname include:
Adam Parr (born 1965), British investment banker
Albert Eide Parr (1900-1991)  Norwegian-born, American marine biologist, zoologist and oceanographer
Allan Parr (1879–1954), Canadian hockey player
Anne Parr (disambiguation), various people
Archie Parr (1860–1942), American rancher and politician
Bartholomew Parr (1750–1810), British physician
Ben Parr (born 1985), American journalist, author, venture capitalist and entrepreneur
Bob Parr (born 1957), New Zealand television personality, former UK Special Forces operator
Butler Parr (1810–1872), English cricketer
Carolyn Miller Parr (born 1937), judge of the United States Tax Court
Catherine Parr (1512–1548), Queen of England (1543–1547)
Cecil Parr (1847–1928), British tennis player
Charles Henry Parr (1868–1941), American mechanical engineer
Charlie Parr (born 1967), American country blues musician
Chris Parr (born 1944), British theatre director and television executive
Cory Parr (born 1987), American tennis player
Delia Parr, pen name of Mary Lechleidner, American author
Edmund Parr (1849–1925), American politician
Eleeshushe Parr (1896–1975), Inuk artist
Elizabeth Parr (disambiguation), various people
Frank Parr (1918–2003), English chess player
Frank Parr (musician) (1928–2012), English cricketer
Gary Parr, American investment banker
George Parr (cricketer) (1826–1891), English cricketer
George Berham Parr (1901–1975), American rancher and politician
Gordon Parr (born 1938), English footballer
Harriet Parr (1828–1900), British author
Harry Parr (born 1914), English footballer
Harry Parr (footballer, born 1915) (1915–2004), English footballer
Hugo Parr (born 1947), Norwegian physicist, civil servant and politician
Jack Parr (1936–2015), American basketball player
Jackie Parr (1920–1985), English footballer
James Parr (disambiguation), various people
Jerry Parr (1930–2015), Secret Service agent for Ronald Reagan
Jill Parr, American musician
Jim Parr (1927-2000), English-Canadian academic, broadcaster and civil servant
Jocelyn Parr (born 1967), New Zealand footballer
Jocelyn Parr (writer), Canadian writer
John Parr (disambiguation), various people
John Wayne Parr (born 1976), Australian kickboxer
Jonathan Parr (born 1988), Norwegian footballer
Joseph Parr (1790–1868), town crier of Derby
Joy Parr (born 1949), Canadian historian
Judy Margaret Parr, New Zealand educational psychologist
Katherine Parr (actress), English actress
Ken Parr, English rugby league footballer
Ken Parr (sport shooter) (born 1962), British sport shooter
Kenneth Parr (born 1988), British sport shooter
Larry Parr (chess player) (1946–2011), American chess player, author and editor
Larry Parr (director), New Zealand film director and screenwriter
Lenton Parr (1924–2003), Australian sculptor and art teacher
Leslie Parr (1897–1956), Australian politician
Lily Parr (1905–1978), English footballer
Louisa Parr (–1903), British writer
Lulu Bell Parr (1876–1960), American Wild West performer
Maria Parr (born 1981), Norwegian children's writer
Martin Parr (born 1952), British documentary photographer, photojournalist and photobook collector
Martin Willoughby Parr (1892–1985), governor of the British-administered province of Equatoria in Anglo-Egyptian Sudan
Mary Parr (born 1961), Irish hurdler
Matthew Parr (disambiguation), various people
Maud Green, Lady Parr (1492–1531), mother-in-law of Henry VIII
Michael Parr (born 1986), British actor
Mike Parr (born 1945), Australian performance artist and printmaker
Nowell Parr (1864–1933), British architect
Percival Parr (1859–1912), English footballer
Rajat Parr, Indian-American sommelier and winemaker
Ralph Parr (1924–2012), American flying ace
Richard Parr (–1644), English bishop
Robert Parr (1921–2017), American chemist
Robert Parr, pseudonym of Erle Stanley Gardner (1889–1970)
Rose Marie Parr, Chief Pharmaceutical Officer for Scotland
Russ Parr (born 1959), American radio and television personality
Samuel Parr (1747 – 1825), English schoolmaster and writer
Samuel Parr (cricketer) (1820–1873), English cricketer
Samuel Wilson Parr (1857–1931), American chemist
Simon Parr, British Chief Constable
Steve Parr (broadcaster) (born 1955), New Zealand television and radio personality
Steve Parr (footballer) (1926–2019), English footballer
Susanna Parr, British religious writer
Sydney Parr, American softball player
Terence Parr (born 1964), American computer scientist
Thelma Parr (1906–2000), American actress
Thomas Parr (disambiguation), various people
Todd Parr (born 1962), American children's writer
Old Tom Parr (reputedly 1483–1635), English supercentenarian who claimed to have lived for 152 years
Tony Parr (born 1955), Royal New Zealand Navy admiral
William Parr (disambiguation), various people

Fictional characters
The Parr family, from The Incredibles
Robert "Bob" Parr – Mr. Incredible
Helen Parr (The Incredibles)
Violet Parr
Dash Parr
Jack-Jack Parr

English-language surnames